The Verde River Sheep Bridge, also known as the Red Point Sheep Bridge, is a suspension bridge which crosses the Verde River in Arizona. Constructed primarily to allow sheep to be driven between grazing ranges on either side of the river. Building started in 1943 and was completed in 1944. Sheep drives stopped in 1978. The bridge was closed in 1987 and largely demolished in 1988. A replica bridge was constructed by the U.S. Forest Service in 1989 to allow hikers access to the Mazatzal Wilderness in Tonto National Forest. The original west suspension tower still remains alongside the replica bridge.

History

Dr. R. O. Raymond of the Flagstaff Sheep Company owned a winter sheep allotment on the east side of the Verde River and a summer allotment on the west side. Access between the sides was difficult, and high water conditions could make it hazardous to ford the river. Raymond decided to fund the construction of a narrow suspension bridge across the Verde to make the crossing easier. A road was built to the bridge site in 1943 and construction was started on a bridge to a design by C. O. Gilliam. It was built using surplus materials from the Bluebell Mine, as well as some cables from the Golden Turkey Mine. The builders were Frank Auza, the Flagstaff Sheep Company's foreman, and George W. Smith, a local builder, with a crew of more than thirty Basque, French Basque, Mexican and Hispanic sheepherders. Auza and Smith visited the Blue Point Sheep Bridge on the Salt River to learn about its construction, deciding to call the Verde River bridge the Red Point Bridge. The total cost of the bridge as originally built was $7,277. Auza maintained the bridge until 1978, when sheep herding was discontinued in the area.

Description
The deck and railings are wood. Although Gilliam designed the tower legs as large timbers, they were made of built-up 2x10s which were more readily available. However, this assembly soon deteriorated, so Auza erected formwork around them and poured concrete towers. Sway bracing was provided by wire cable stays.

Designation and replacement
The bridge was placed on the National Register of Historic Places on November 21, 1978. The original bridge was closed in 1987 and was replaced by a replica in 1989. It provides access to the Mazatzal Wilderness in Tonto National Forest. The bridge is maintained as part of the forest's trail system. The original bridge's concrete abutment remains.

See also
List of bridges documented by the Historic American Engineering Record in Arizona

References

External links

Sheeps Bridge at Tonto National Forest

Verde River Sheep Crossing at bridgemeister.com

Buildings and structures in Yavapai County, Arizona
Historic American Engineering Record in Arizona
Suspension bridges in Arizona
Tonto National Forest
Agricultural buildings and structures on the National Register of Historic Places
Bridges on the National Register of Historic Places in Arizona
National Register of Historic Places in Yavapai County, Arizona
Agricultural buildings and structures on the National Register of Historic Places in Arizona
Towers in Arizona
Bridges completed in 1944
Concrete bridges in the United States
Wooden bridges in the United States
Buildings and structures demolished in 1988
1944 establishments in Arizona